Predrag "Peca" Brzaković (27 September 1964 – 14 September 2012) was a Serbian footballer who played as a goalkeeper.

Club career
Brzaković played for five seasons with OFK Beograd in the Yugoslav Second League, before switching to Yugoslav First League club Vojvodina in the 1991 winter transfer window. He spent two years there before joining Radnički Beograd during the winter break of the 1992–93 season. Later on, Brzaković also played abroad in Cyprus and China.

International career
In April 1996, Brzaković was an unused substitute in FR Yugoslavia's 3–1 home victory over the Faroe Islands.

Futsal career
After retiring from football, Brzaković played futsal for Serbia's Marbo and Ekonomac, but also for Montenegro's Municipium. He represented Serbia at the 2007 UEFA Futsal Championship, aged 43.

Death
On 14 September 2012, Brzaković suddenly died due to a heart attack.

Career statistics

References

External links
 
 

Association football goalkeepers
Expatriate footballers in China
Expatriate footballers in Cyprus
First League of Serbia and Montenegro players
FK Čukarički players
FK Radnički Beograd players
FK Vojvodina players
FK Zvezdara players
Footballers from Belgrade
Futsal goalkeepers
OFK Beograd players
Serbia and Montenegro expatriate footballers
Serbia and Montenegro expatriate sportspeople in China
Serbia and Montenegro expatriate sportspeople in Cyprus
Serbia and Montenegro footballers
Serbian footballers
Serbian men's futsal players
Yugoslav First League players
Yugoslav footballers
Yugoslav Second League players
1964 births
2012 deaths